Dalskilvatnet is a lake at Barentsøya, Svalbard. The lake separates the two valleys of Grimdalen, which drains to the north, and Sjodalen, which drains to the west.

References

Lakes of Svalbard
Barentsøya